Lenox is an unincorporated community in western Dent County, Missouri, United States. The community is located approximately twelve miles west of Salem at the intersection of routes H and C. Edgar Springs is approximately four miles to the northwest in adjacent Phelps County and the community of Maples is 4.5 miles to the south in Texas County.

A post office called Lenox was established in 1884, and remained in operation until 1998. The community has the name of the local Lenox family, pioneer citizens.

References

Unincorporated communities in Dent County, Missouri
Unincorporated communities in Missouri